Joža Uprka (26 October 1861, Kněždub – 12 January 1940, Hroznová Lhota) was a Czech painter and graphic artist, whose work combines elements of Impressionism and Art Nouveau to document the folklife of Southern Moravia.

Biography

He was born to a peasant family. His father was an amateur painter, which inspired Joža and his brother, František, to pursue careers in art. After completing his primary education, he enrolled at the Academy of Fine Arts, Prague, where he studied with František Čermák. After Čermák's death, he transferred to the Academy of Fine Arts, Munich, where he was one of the founders of a Czech student organization called "Škréta" (after Karel Škréta), a group that included Alfons Mucha, Antonín Slavíček, Pavol Socháň and Luděk Marold.

In 1888, he returned home and began painting scenes from peasant life. From 1892 to 1893, he was able to study in Paris, thanks to a scholarship and, in 1894, with Mucha's assistance, gave a showing at the Salon. His first major exhibition in Prague came in 1897.

He was married in 1899 and, shortly after, bought a small house in Hroznová Lhota, which he used as a studio. In 1904, it was transformed into a two-story villa, inspired by folk architecture, with a design by Dušan Jurkovič. It soon became a popular meeting place for many notable Czech artists, writers and composers. The following year, however, his wife's mental condition, which was always poor, took a turn for the worse and it was necessary to place her in the mental hospital at Kroměříž. She stayed there until her death in 1959.

After this time, he largely turned away from painting to do etchings. From 1922 to 1937, he lived in a castle in Ilava and maintained a studio in the Slovakian countryside, where he went for inspiration. In 1928, he visited Dubrovnik, where he observed the local customs. His folk paintings received a major showing in Uherské Hradiště at the "Výstava Slovácka 1937". He died of kidney failure three years later, and was returned to his place of birth for burial.

In 2011, a school in Hroznová Lhota was named after him.

Selected paintings

References

Further reading
 Štěpán Jež and Jakub Obrovský, Joža Uprka : k pátému výročí umělcovy smrti (On the fifth anniversary of his death), Sfinx, 1945
 Jaroslav Kačer, Joža Uprka : výběr z malířského díla (Selection of paintings), exhibition catalog, Moravian Gallery in Brno, 1983
 Petra Karpíšková, Příběh moderního tvůrce. Joža Uprka (1861-1940) (Story of a modern creator), Thesis, University of South Bohemia in České Budějovice, 2007 Online
 František Šantavý and Jaroslav Pelikán, Joža Uprka : Grafické dílo z let 1899–1937 (graphic works), Hodonín, 1981
 Joža Uprka: 1861-1940 : Evropan slováckého venkova (Rural Slovakia), National Gallery, Prague, 2011

External links

 Photograph from the blog "White Carpathians" (probably not copyright-free)
 Joža Uprka. Kožuchy ("Furs", a study of folk costume). Kroměříž, 1920. Text online.
 Joža Uprka - barvy a písně (colors and songs) - video from Česká televize

1861 births
1940 deaths
People from Hodonín District
People from the Margraviate of Moravia
Czech graphic designers
19th-century Czech painters
Czech male painters
20th-century Czech painters
Academy of Fine Arts, Prague alumni
Academy of Fine Arts, Munich alumni
Deaths from kidney failure
19th-century Czech male artists
20th-century Czech male artists